Vertically challenged may refer to:

 Vertically challenged, a euphemism for short stature.
 Vertically Challenged (album), a 2005 record by Lady Sovereign.